Mailboat Records is an independent record label established in 1999 by American singer-songwriter Jimmy Buffett after his vanity label Margaritaville Records was absorbed by Island Records when they were sold to Universal Music Group, owner of Buffett's previous label MCA Records. Mailboat's first release was Buffett's Buffett Live: Tuesdays, Thursdays, Saturdays.

In addition to Buffett, the label's roster includes Dan Fogelberg, Bret Michaels, Boz Scaggs, Def Leppard (North America only), Sammy Hagar, Walter Becker, Jim Mayer, and Mark Twain: Words & Music, a compilation CD featuring Jimmy Buffett as Huckleberry Finn, Clint Eastwood as Mark Twain, and narration by Garrison Keillor. Other featured artists on the Twain project include Brad Paisley, Sheryl Crow, Emmylou Harris, Vince Gill, Ricky Skaggs, and Joe Diffie. The Twain project is a benefit for the Mark Twain Boyhood Home & Museum in Hannibal, Missouri. Harold Sulman is the president of Mailboat Records.

See also
 Jimmy Buffett discography
 List of record labels

References

External links
 

American independent record labels
Record labels established in 1999
Vanity record labels
Jimmy Buffett
Record labels based in California
1999 establishments in California